Bruno Geuens (born 20 October 1963) is a Belgian former professional racing cyclist. He rode in the 1988 Paris–Roubaix and finished in 52nd.

Major results
Sources:
1985
 2nd Ronde van Vlaanderen Beloften
 3rd Paris–Roubaix Espoirs
1986
 3rd GP Odiel Lambrechts
 5th Circuit des Frontières
 8th Grote Prijs Jef Scherens
1987
 3rd De Kustpijl
 9th Grote Prijs Jef Scherens
1988
 8th GP Stad Zottegem
1989
 6th GP de la Ville de Rennes
1990
 2nd Schaal Sels
 10th GP de la Ville de Rennes

Grand Tour result
Source:

References

External links
 

1963 births
Living people
Belgian male cyclists
Place of birth missing (living people)